Janina Kneipp is a German scientist who is Professor of Physical Chemistry Humboldt University of Berlin. Her research considers surface enhanced Raman scattering and plasmonic enhancement in multi-modal micro spectroscopy.

Early life and education 
Kneipp was an undergraduate student at the Free University of Berlin, where she specialised in biology and physics. She remained in Berlin for graduate studies, where she worked on Fourier-transform infrared spectroscopy at RKI. After earning her doctorate, she moved to the Erasmus University Rotterdam, where she worked on optical spectroscopies. She was a postdoctoral researcher at Princeton University.

Research and career 
In 2005, Kneipp joined the BAM Federal Institute for Materials Research and Testing. She moved to the Humboldt University of Berlin in 2008. Her research develops multi-photon spectroscopy for bioanalysis. She was supported by the European Research Council to develop Multiphoton Processes Using Plasmonics. As part of her work, Kneipp developed multi-functional nanosensors, which can be combined with plasmonic nanoparticles and provide multiple surface-enhanced spectroscopic signatures. Plasmonic structures can enhance local optical fields, In particular, Kneipp is interested in Surface-enhanced Raman scattering (SERS) of complex samples. She uses SERS to better understand how molecules interact with nanostructures, for applications in biospectroscopy and in plasmonic catalysis.

Beyond SERS, Kneipp has shown that a combination of Raman spectroscopy with other methods can be used to study plant samples. Vibrational spectra of plants can provide information about the biochemical composition of structures like pollen, and can give information on plant-climate interactions.

From 2015-2020, Kneipp joined the German Research Foundation (DFG) review board for chemistry. She is member of excellence cluster UniSysCat and the Einstein Center of Catalysis. She is co-founder of the School of Analytical Sciences Adlershof (SALSA), a graduate program at HU.

Awards and honours 
 2010 European Research Council Starting Grant
 2010 Bunsen-Kirchhoff Award for Analytical Spectroscopy
 2013 Wilhelm Ostwald Fellow
 2018 Caroline von Humboldt Professorship

Selected publications

References 

German women physicists
German women chemists
German biochemists
Spectroscopists
Academic staff of the Humboldt University of Berlin
Free University of Berlin alumni
21st-century German physicists
Year of birth missing (living people)
Living people